MTV Hits Latin America was a 24-hour non-stop contemporary hit music channel from ViacomCBS Networks Americas that debuted in 2008. The format of the network resembles that of the classic MTV Latin America before the addition of other programming to that network in the 2000s and their slow decline of music video programming. The network had a schedule consisted of only videos, interrupted by promotional advertising for MTV Latin America and limited commercials on the network. Like the other digital MTV/VH1 channels, MTV Hits Latin America used to be based on an automated wheel schedule introduced in the first years of MTV2 in the US. This practice, though, has now been reduced, with five themed zones - namely MTV Hits Playlistism, Hitlist, Biggest! Hottest! Loudest!, MTV Classic and Weekend Playlist - being scheduled at predetermined timeslots.

The channel was replaced by the European version of MTV Hits on August 5, 2020.

MTV channels
Music video networks in the United States
Television channel articles with incorrect naming style
Television channels and stations established in 2008
Television channels and stations disestablished in 2020